Javier Botello (born 27 January 1976) is a Spanish former freestyle swimmer who competed in the 2000 Summer Olympics.

References

1979 births
Living people
Spanish male freestyle swimmers
Olympic swimmers of Spain
Swimmers at the 2000 Summer Olympics
South Carolina Gamecocks men's swimmers